Louis W. Schultz (March 24, 1927 – February 19, 2008) is a former justice of the Iowa Supreme Court from August 19, 1980, to September 6, 1993, appointed from Johnson County, Iowa.

He graduated from Deep River High School in 1944, and attended Central College. He received an LL.B. from Drake University in 1949. He worked for Farm Bureau Insurance for a time, and entered the practice of law in Marengo, Iowa in 1956, serving as a county attorney from 1960 to 1968. He was a judge of the 6th Judicial District of Iowa from 1970 to August 19, 1980, when he was appointed to the Supreme Court.

Schultz died in his sleep from heart disease in his home in Williamsburg, Iowa, at the age of 80.

External links

References

Justices of the Iowa Supreme Court
1927 births
2008 deaths
Place of birth missing
20th-century American judges